Martijntje Quik (born 24 October 1973 in De Bilt) is a former coxswain from the Netherlands. She won a silver medal in the women's eight in the 2000 Summer Olympics in Sydney, Australia.

References

  Dutch Olympic Committee

1973 births
Living people
Coxswains (rowing)
Dutch female rowers
Olympic medalists in rowing
Olympic rowers of the Netherlands
Olympic silver medalists for the Netherlands
People from De Bilt
Rowers at the 2000 Summer Olympics
Medalists at the 2000 Summer Olympics
Sportspeople from Utrecht (province)
20th-century Dutch women
20th-century Dutch people